Bernhard Müller (born	9 March 1957) is as a Swiss military official. He was the Commander of the Swiss Air Force.

Early life
Müller grew up in the town of Wettingen in  the canton of Aargau. He attended the teacher's seminar. there, Later he graduated from the University of Zurich.

Career 
In 1987, he became a chief flight instructor at the introduction of the Super Pumas in the Swiss Air Force. After various positions as an officer in the Swiss Air Force, he became Chief of the Swiss Air Force Operations and Deputy Commander of the Luftwaffe on April 1, 2009. The Swiss Federal Council promoted Müller to commander of the Swiss Air Force on March 22, 2017. He succeeds Aldo C. Schellenberg starting January 1, 2018 until 30. Jun 2021. 

Since 2009, Müller has been a member of the Board of Directors of the Swiss air traffic control agency Skyguide. From 2009 to 2021, Müller was a member of the Board of Directors of Swiss Air Security Skyguide.

Positions 
As a militia officer, Müller :

 2001-2003: Commander Alpnach Air Base (ad hoc)
 2000-2002: Chief of Staff Air Brigade 31
 1993-1999: General Staff Officer Airborne Brigade 31
 1989-1992: Commander Lufttransport Staffel 6

Müller was a chief instructor during the introduction of the Eurocopter AS332 Super Puma. Among other things, he directed humanitarian helicopter missions for the Swiss Army in Albania and Sumatra as well as firefighting missions in Greece.

Decorations and awards

References

External links

 Official page about Bernhard Müller
  Bernhard Müller in the Newspaper Tagesanzeiger (German)
 Bernhard Müller  in Blick online news (German)
 Bernhard Müller, new Commander of the Swiss Air Force Newspaper Der Bund (German).
Müller in Hausse des mouvements aériens à Payerne (French)
Müller in Berner Zeitung (German)
Bernhard Müller, build up 24h QRA
Bernhard Müller  soon new Air Force Commander (French)

Living people
1957 births
Swiss generals
Swiss Air Force personnel